, known as Zhang Zongyuan ( in Chinese after changing his name and nationality, was a Japanese bandit and rōnin active in early 20th century China. He was a part of the Manchu-Mongol Independence Movement and the Shandong Autonomy Movement. He was a descendant of Date Masamune and a member of the Date clan.

Early life
Date Junnosuke was born to a Kazoku family, descended from the Daimyō of the Sendai Domain, the Date clan. His grandfather, Date Munenari, was a politician under Emperor Meiji. His father, Date Muneatsu, was the governor of the Sendai Domain. He went to several schools, including Azabu Junior High School, Keio Junior High School, Gakushuin, and Rikkyo Junior High School. He finally graduated from Kaijo Junior High School in 1914 and was accepted into Waseda University to study at the Faculty of Literature. However, he later dropped out.

Date was known for not being a well-behaved youth. As a student in Rikkyo Junior High School, on May 13, 1909, an argument with delinquent youths in Akashichō, Tokyo, escalated to the point where Date pulled out his gun and shot them, killing them. On October 15, 1909, the Tokyo District Court sentenced him to 12 years in prison. The sentence was shortened to 6 years after an appeal ruling in June 1910, at the request of the Date family lawyers. Detective Saburo Iwai's investigation of the victim's behavior helped the Date family lawyers' defence that he was acting in self-defence. The Supreme Court of Judicature of Japan gave him probation and released him.

Political activities
Date was good friends with Ikki Kita, Shumei Okawa, and Onisaburo Deguchi. He participated in a 1916 plot to assassinate Zhang Zuolin and a 1919 plot to assassinate Yamagata Aritomo.

In 1916, Kawashima Naniwa and Aisin-Gioro Shanyu created the Second Manchu-Mongol Independence Movement, which Date joined. He traveled to China, where he became a continental ronin. After the movement's failure, he created the Shandong Autonomy Allied Army in 1938 under the orders of Terauchi Hisaichi. In 1929, he made a pact of brotherhood with Fengtian clique warlord Zhang Zongchang, leading to Date renaming himself Zhang Zongyuan and trying to integrate into Chinese society, changing his nationality to Chinese in 1931. He commanded the Kenkoku Dainigun. On July 27, 1935, Date tried to support a coup in Beijing, but failed.

In 1919, Date came under the Governor-General of Korea, Saitō Makoto. He traveled to Korea and became the chief of the border guard in Uiju County. In 1923, he raided the base of armed Koreans.

Second Sino-Japanese War
He was a firm believer in the autonomy or independence of the Manchu, Mongol, and Lu (Han Chinese people from Shandong) peoples. He led 4,000 troops from Manchuria to Shandong in 1937, using his connections to transfer himself to Shandong. He took over Jinan and used it as his headquarters as the "King" of Shandong. He advised many bandit units in the Jehol campaign. In late January 1939, he led a massacre in Ye County (today known as Laizhou), killing around 400 people. This was known as the Yexian (Ye County) Incident, and led to the dissolution of Date's unit in 1940. In 1945, Date tried to organize a unit called the Zhang Zongyuan Unit, but his attempt was unsuccessful and the unit failed quickly.

After the surrender of Japan at the end of World War II, Date was arrested for war crimes. He was held in the Qingdao Detention Center and moved to the Shanghai Temporary War Criminal Detention Center. He was sentenced to death, and Date was moved to Shanghai Prison, where he was executed by firing squad on September 9, 1948.

References 

1892 births
1948 deaths
Japanese people executed for war crimes
Date clan
People executed by the Republic of China by firearm
20th-century executions by China
Japanese emigrants to China
Chinese people of Japanese descent